David Yang (born 1967) is an American violist born in New York City.

Biography
David Yang's principal studies were with Martha Strongin Katz, Heidi Castleman, Karen Ritscher, and Stephen Wyrczynski. He is known mainly as a chamber musician and has collaborated with members of ensembles such as the Tokyo String Quartet, Brentano String Quartet, Borromeo String Quartet, Cassatt String Quartet, Miro String Quartet, Vermeer String Quartet, and Trio Solisti, Trio Cavatina, and Eroica Piano Trio. In 2009 he received an artist fellowship from the Independence Foundation in Philadelphia, PA awarded to a small number of "exceptional artists." Yang founded the chamber music program at the University of Pennsylvania in Philadelphia and was Director for 20 years. He also founded and is Artistic Director of the Newburyport Chamber Music Festival. As a founding member of the string trio Ensemble Epomeo (his playing described as "lithe and expressive" by The Strad Magazine) he performed throughout Europe, Canada, and the USA. An advocate for new music, he has commissioned and premiered works by over twenty composers including Robert Capanna, Andrea Clearfield, Daniel Dorff, Jon Deak, Eric Ewazen, Cynthia Folio,  Jeremy Gill, Gerald Levinson, David Ludwig, Robert Maggio, Jay Reise, Kile Smith, Dmitri Tymoczko, Anna Weesner, and Andrew Waggoner. He is Director of the storytelling and music troupe, Auricolae, for which he composes music, and commissioned many pieces consisting of storytelling and music for narrator, violin, and cello and also a member of the Voyager Ensemble and Tamayura Quartet + Koto.  He holds a master's degree in architecture from the University of Pennsylvania and worked in the atelier of Aldo Rossi and for Hugh Hardy.
 
Yang plays a viola made by the viola da gamba maker Johannes Tielka in 1670 and originally owned by the 19th-Century violin virtuoso Joseph Joachim, best friend of Johannes Brahms. He records for the New Focus, Somm, and Avie labels. He is an avid cyclist and swimmer.
 
His father was noted landscape photographer John Yang and his mother, Linda Gureasko Yang, was garden columnist for The New York Times . His sister was electric bass player Naomi Yang of the 90s cult alternative band Galaxie 500. He has two daughters, Eliana Razzino, and Alessandra.

References

External links 
 Ensemble Epomeo profile
  Newburyport Chamber Music Festival
 Auricolae Storytelling and Music Troupe
  John Yang, photographer

1967 births
Living people
Musicians from New York City
American violists